is a 2012 Japanese historical television series. It is the 51st NHK taiga drama.

Production

Production Credits
Original – Yuki Fujiumoto
Music – Takashi Yoshimatsu
Titling – Shōko Kanazawa
Narrator – Masaki Okada
Historical research – Masaaki Takahashi
Sword fight arranger - Kunishirō Hayashi
Architectural research – Sei Hirai
Clothing research – Kiyoko Koizumi

Cast

Taira clan (Heike)
Kenichi Matsuyama as Taira no Kiyomori, a military leader of the late Heian period of Japan
Ōshirō Maeda as young Kiyomori
Kiichi Nakai as Taira no Tadamori, the father of Taira no Kiyomori
Atsuo Nakamura as Taira no Masamori
Kōsuke Toyohara as Taira no Tadamasa
Nakamura Baijaku II as Taira no Iesada
Kyoko Fukada as Taira no Tokiko, Kiyomori's wife
Ai Kato as Takashina no Akiko
Takaya Kamikawa as Taira no Morikuni
Go Morita as Taira no Tokitada
Takahiro Fujimoto as Itō Tadakiyo
Shunsuke Daito as Taira no Iemori
Takahiro Nishijima as Taira no Yorimori
Masataka Kubota as Taira no Shigemori
Takuma Hiraoka as young Shigemori
Hideo Ishiguro as Taira no Munemori
Takuya Kusakawa as young Munemori
Koji Kato as Usagimaru
Mahiro Takasugi as Kousagimaru
Emi Wakui as Ikenozenni
Riko Narumi as "Kenshunmon-in" Shigeko
Fumi Nikaido as Taira no Tokuko

Minamoto clan (Genji)
Fumiyo Kohinata as Minamoto no Tameyoshi, a head of the Minamoto samurai clan
Hiroshi Tamaki as Minamoto no Yoshitomo
Rena Tanaka as Yura Gozen
Emi Takei as Tokiwa Gozen
Masaki Okada as Minamoto no Yoritomo, Yoshitomo's third son / Narrator
Taishi Nakagawa as young Yoritomo
Ryunosuke Kamiki as Minamoto no Yoshitsune, Yoshitomo's ninth son
Ryunosuke Hashino as young Yoshitsune (a.k.a. Ushiwakamaru)
Munetaka Aoki as Benkei
Takashi Ukaji as Minamoto no Yorimasa
Kenichi Endō as Hōjō Tokimasa
Mayumi Tsukiyama as Maki no Kata
Anne as Hōjō Masako
Takuya Nakayama as Hōjō Yoshitoki
Takashi Tsukamoto as Tōkurō
Saki Fukuda as Yae, Yoritomo's first wife.

Imperial family
Shirō Itō as Emperor Shirakawa, the 72nd emperor of Japan
Hiroshi Mikami as Emperor Toba, the 74th emperor of Japan
Arata Iura as Emperor Sutoku, the 75th emperor of Japan
Takumi Kitamura as Emperor Konoe, the 76th emperor of Japan
Shota Matsuda as Emperor Go-Shirakawa, the 77th emperor of Japan
Satoshi Tomiura as Emperor Nijō, the 78th emperor of Japan
Yudai Chiba as Emperor Takakura, the 80th emperor of Japan
Yūta Tanaka as Emperor Antoku, the 81st emperor of Japan

Others
Naohito Fujiki as Saigyō
Seiko Matsuda as Gion no nyōgo
Yasuko Matsuyuki as Bifukumon'in
Rei Dan as Taikenmon'in, the consort of Emperor Toba
Sadao Abe as Shinzei
Koji Yamamoto as Fujiwara no Yorinaga
Keisuke Horibe as Fujiwara no Tadamichi
Jun Kunimura as Fujiwara no Tadazane
Shigeki Hosokawa as Fujiwara no Motofusa
Hisashi Yoshizawa　as Fujiwara no Narichika
Toranosuke Kato as Saikō
Toru Nomaguchi as Fujiwara no Korekata (episodes 25, 26, and 28)
Toshihiro Yashiba as Fujiwara no Korekata (episode 19)
Manabu Hamada as Kajiwara Kagetoki
Kō Takasugi as Kazusa Hirotsune
Toshiya Nagasawa as Takeda Nobuyoshi
Ryūta Mine as Itō Sukechika
Seiji Kinoshita as Ōba Kagechika
Shun Sugata as Miura Yoshiaki
Hajime Tanimoto as Miura Yoshizumi, Yoshiaki's son
Kenzō as Sasaki Hideyoshi
Moro Moro'oka as Doi Sanehira
Masakazu Itō as Chiba Tsunetane
Ryū Nakamura as Yamaki Kanetaka
Muga Tsukaji as Fujiwara no Nobuyori
Masaki Kyomoto as Fujiwara no Hidehira

External links
Official site 

Taiga drama
2012 Japanese television series debuts
2012 Japanese television series endings
Cultural depictions of Taira no Kiyomori
Cultural depictions of Minamoto no Yoshitsune
Television series set in the 12th century